Kalanjoor Narayana Panicker Balagopal (born 28 July 1963) is an Indian Politician belonging to the Communist Party of India (Marxist), who is serving as the Minister for Finance,  Government of Kerala and Member of Legislative Assembly representing Kottarakkara. He was a member of the Rajya Sabha the Upper house of Indian Parliament from 2010 to 2016.

Personal life
Son of P. K. Narayana Panicker and Radhamony Amma, Balagopal was born at Kalanjoor, Pathanamthitta on 28 July 1963. Balagopal is an M.Com., LL.B., LL.M. graduate as well as a social and political worker. He married Asha Prabhakaran on 24 March 1999 and the couple have one son and one daughter. His brother Kalanjoor Madhu is one of the director board members of the Nair Service Society leadership.

Political career
He entered politics through Students Federation of India and held positions such as district president (Kollam), state president (Kerala), and all India President of SFI and DYFI. He was also the President of Kerala University Employees Confederation and a Member of Student Syndicate, Kerala University. He was the Political Secretary of Chief Minister of Kerala, Shri V.S. Achuthanandan from 31 May 2006 – 13 March 2010. He is a member of CPI(M) Kerala State Committee since 1998. He was elected to Rajya sabha in April 2010 and was a Member of Parliament from April 2010-April 2016. In 2021 Kerala Assembly Election, he was elected to the Legislative Assembly from Kottarakkara constituency by a margin of 10814. He is now selected as Central Committee member of CPI(M).

References

External links
 K.N. Balagopal Rajya Sabha Biography

1963 births
Living people
Communist Party of India (Marxist) politicians from Kerala
Rajya Sabha members from Kerala
People from Pathanamthitta district
Students' Federation of India All India Presidents
DYFI All India Presidents